The Polestar 1 is a 2-door plug-in hybrid sports car marketed by Polestar, a brand of Volvo Cars. It is the first car produced by the company since becoming an independent car manufacturer in June 2017. Based on Volvo's Concept Coupé from 2013, the Polestar 1 is built on the Volvo Scalable Product Architecture platform and is powered by a hybrid powertrain, using a front-mounted engine and two electric motors at the rear. A limited production run has been capped to three years with a total of 1,500 units to be produced for the left-hand drive market only. Production is to take place in Chengdu, China, where the company's first production facility was built.

History 

The Polestar 1 started as Volvo's Concept Coupé from 2013, styled by German car designer Thomas Ingenlath, who previously worked in lead design positions at Audi, Volkswagen and Škoda. After the unveiling of the Concept Coupé, Ingenlath said that the model took inspiration from the Volvo P1800, stating that "it is a car designer’s duty to reflect and incorporate design signatures that are vital parts of the company’s heritage".

The Polestar 1 was unveiled on October 17, 2017 at the Shanghai Auto Show, making its world premiere and first public appearance. It came after several teasers were released from the company, including a video revealing the car's reveal date while a number of detail photographs were posted by the company's Instagram account from October 2 to 16, 2017.

In June of 2019, Polestar announced that the Polestar 1 was entering its final stages of development as a prototype, before production would officially commence in the later-unveiled production site in Chengdu, China.

In April of 2021, the final version of the Polestar 1 was unveiled at the 2021 Shanghai Auto Show. This matte-gold Polestar 1 was designed to commemorate the final run of production and featured no difference to the original car other than the paint. Only 25 were made, with a USD$5,000 price increase over the base MSRP.

The production of the Polestar 1 has officially ended later in 2022 and the Polestar 5 and 4 is said to replace it later in 2024 or 2025.

Design 

The Polestar 1 is powered by a hybrid powertrain, using a twincharged 2.0-litre inline four-cylinder petrol engine from the Volvo XC90 T8 to power the front wheels, with an additional two electric motors powering the rear wheels. Amongst the petrol engine and batteries, an Integrated Starter Generator is also equipped to the Volvo Scalable Product Architecture platform, acting as a starter motor and torque fill during gear changes.

It is said that  can take 4.2 seconds.

Powertrain

Batteries

The Polestar 1 has a total capacity of 34 kWh arranged in three battery stacks (two packs). This gives the Polestar 1 an all-electric range of 150 km (NEDC). In February 2018, Polestar claimed that this was the largest electric range for any plug-in hybrid available at the time.

Power distribution

The Polestar 1 has a plug-in hybrid powertrain, the supercharged and turbocharged high-performance petrol in-line four-cylinder petrol engine drives the front wheels. Two electric motors drive the rear wheels. In addition to these electric motors the Polestar 1 is equipped with an Integrated Starter Generator (ISG). Combined with the electric motors are planetary gear sets. These planetary gear sets enable torque vectoring, a technology used in racing to bring both acceleration and stability through curves.

Design

Exterior

Practically all parts of the Polestar 1 upper body, including doors, bonnet and boot-lid, are made of carbon fibre reinforced polymer (CFRP) for maximum stiffness, torsional rigidity and lightness. The Polestar 1 has a standard-fitted active rear spoiler delivering high-speed downforce on the rear axle. It automatically raises from its integrated flush position when the speed exceeds  and is retracted when the speed is reduced below . Polestar 1 comes with a fixed panoramic glass roof, stretching all the way from the top of the windscreen to the upper edge of the rear window. The interior features handcrafted leather detailing and a carbon fibre wing that stretches to the full height of the instrument panel. The Polestar 1 also comes with a Bowers & Wilkins high-end sound system. The tyre sizes are 275/30 R21 for the front and 295/30 R21 for the rear. The Polestar 1 is available in six colors: Space, Snow, Midnight, Osmium, Osmium Grey, and Magnesium, with two options for the interior: Charcoal with Zink for the seats or full Charcoal. Three options are available for the rims: Diamond Cut, Glossy Black, and Matte Black.

Interior

The Polestar 1 has double wishbone front suspension, connecting each wheel with two transverse links. This design enables the front suspension to counteract torque steer. Most suspension parts are made of aluminium. The rear suspension is an integral link design, with a transverse composite leaf spring. Polestar 1 is the first car with Öhlins Continuously Controlled Electronic Suspension (CESi). The CESi can be set to adapt instantly to road conditions and in accordance with the driver’s chosen setting. The front brakes, are specified by Polestar and manufactured by Akebono, six piston aluminium Mono block calipers on each front wheel are milled from one-piece. The calipers are coupled with 400x38mm ventilated and drilled discs.

In popular culture 
The Polestar 1 appears on the cover of and in the 2019 racing video game Need for Speed Heat as a playable vehicle and "hero" car. As part of a marketing promotion, Polestar encouraged fans to design their own modifications to the Polestar 1 and post renders on Instagram with the hashtag #Polestar1xNFSHeat.

References 

Polestar vehicles
Sports cars
Coupés
Plug-in hybrid vehicles
Cars introduced in 2017
All-wheel-drive vehicles
2020s cars